Víctor Pinto is a Paraguayan former association football player and current coach for Club Deportivo Sol del Este in the Paraguayan Tercera División.

He played in the Primera División Paraguaya for Club 12 de Octubre with Dario Veron and Salvador Cabañas.

References

Paraguayan footballers
Living people
12 de Octubre Football Club players
Paraguayan football managers
Association footballers not categorized by position
Year of birth missing (living people)